A.C. "Dick" Johnson (1916–1984) was an Australian professional rugby league footballer who played in the 1930s and 1940s.  He played for Newtown, South Sydney, Western Suburbs and Canterbury-Bankstown as a fullback.

Background
Johnson was from Currabubula near Quirindi, New South Wales.

Playing career
Johnson made his first grade debut for Newtown in 1934.  In 1939, Johnson played for Souths in the 1939 grand final defeat against Balmain.

In 1943, Johnson made the move to Western Suburbs and played there for two seasons.  In 1946, Johnson joined Canterbury and played for the club in the 1947 grand final defeat against Balmain.

Johnson also represented New South Wales on 11 occasions between 1938 and 1945.

References

1916 births
1984 deaths
Australian rugby league players
South Sydney Rabbitohs players
Newtown Jets players
Canterbury-Bankstown Bulldogs players
New South Wales rugby league team players
Rugby league fullbacks
Rugby league players from New South Wales
Western Suburbs Magpies players